The Hesquiaht are one of the Nuu-chah-nulth peoples of the West Coast of Vancouver Island, British Columbia, Canada.  Today the Hesquiaht are governed mostly by the Hesquiaht First Nation band government, though some are in the Tla-O-Qui-Aht First Nations, which also includes the Clayoquot and some of the Ahousaht.

See also
Hesquiat Peninsula

Nuu-chah-nulth
West Coast of Vancouver Island